
Craig may refer to:

Geology
Craig (landform), a rocky hill or mountain often having large chasms or sharp intentations.

People (and fictional characters)
Craig (surname)
Craig (given name)

Places
Scotland
Craig, Angus, aka Barony of Craigie

United States
Craig, Alaska, a city
Craig, Colorado, a city
Craig, Indiana, an unincorporated place
Craig, Iowa, a city
Craig, Missouri, a city
Craig, Montana, an unincorporated place
Craig, Nebraska, a village
Craig, Ohio, an unincorporated community
Craig County, Virginia
Craig County, Oklahoma
Craig Township (disambiguation) (two places)

Other uses
Craig (song)
Craig Electronics, a consumer electronics company
Craig Broadcast Systems, later Craig Media and finally Craig Wireless, a defunct Canadian media and communication company
Clan Craig, a Scottish clan
Craig tube, a piece of scientific apparatus

See also
Craig v. Boren, a U.S. Supreme Court case
 Justice Craig (disambiguation)
Craic, term for news, gossip, etc.